Salah Abdul Rasool Al Blooshi (Arabic: صلاح عبد الرسول البلوشي) is a Bahraini, who was held  in extrajudicial detention in the United States
Guantanamo Bay detainment camps, in Cuba.

On May 15, 2006, the U.S. Department of Defense complied with a court order and released a list of the identities of the Guantanamo detainees.
The DoD calls him Salah Abdul Rasul Ali Abdul Rahman Al Balushi.  His Guantanamo Guantanamo Internment Serial Number was 227.  The DoD reports that he was born on February 12, 1981, in Muharraq, Bahrain.  Mr Al Blooshi was reportedly arrested by Pakistani authorities after crossing over from Afghanistan in December 2001 and handed over to the US military.

Al Blooshi is represented by Joshua Colangelo-Bryan, Esq. The campaign to free the detainee is being led by Bahraini MP Mohammed Khalid.

Combatant Status Review Tribunal

Initially the Bush Presidency asserted that they could withhold all the protections of the Geneva Conventions to captives from the war on terror. This policy was challenged before the Judicial branch. Critics argued that the USA could not evade its obligation to conduct competent tribunals to determine whether captives are, or are not, entitled to the protections of prisoner of war status.

Subsequently the Department of Defense instituted the Combatant Status Review Tribunals. The Tribunals, however, were not authorized to determine whether the captives were lawful combatants—rather they were merely empowered to make a recommendation as to whether the captive had previously been correctly determined to match the Bush Presidency's definition of an enemy combatant.

Summary of Evidence memo
A Summary of Evidence memo was prepared for
Salah Abdul Rasul Ali Abdul Rahman Al Balushi's
Combatant Status Review Tribunal, on September 23, 2004.
The memo listed the following allegations against him:

Transcript
There is no record that captive 227
participated in his Combatant Status Review Tribunal.

Habeas corpus
A writ of habeas corpus, Salah Abdul Rasul Ali Abdul Rahman Al Balushi v. George W. Bush, was submitted on captive 227's behalf.
In response, on October 12, 2004, the Department of Defense released 16
pages of unclassified documents related to his Combatant Status Review Tribunal.

The Legal Advisor's declaration was drafted by Commander James R. Crisfield Jr., a JAG officer. His enemy combatant status was confirmed by Tribunal panel 6 on September 28, 2004.

The Detainee election form prepared by his Personal Representative on 27 September 2004 stated:

{| class="wikitable"
|
Detainee #### unclassified summary was read to him. He asked questions and read the translated unclassified summary himself. At the conclusion of the interview, he affirmatively declined to participate in the Tribunal. In addition, he stated he does not want me to present any evidence or make any statements on his behalf. He was asked if he would regret not participating in the Tribunal if he is found to be an EC.  He stated he would not.
|}

Administrative Review Board hearing

Detainees who were determined to have been properly classified as "enemy combatants" were scheduled to have their dossier reviewed at annual Administrative Review Board hearings. The Administrative Review Boards were not authorized to review whether a detainee qualified for POW status, nor were they authorized to review whether a detainee should have been classified as an "enemy combatant".

They were authorized to consider whether a detainee should continue to be detained by the United States, because they continued to pose a threat, or whether they could safely be repatriated to the custody of their home country, or whether they could be set free.

First annual Administrative Review Board
A Summary of Evidence memo was prepared for
Salah Abdul Rasul Ali Abdul Al Balushi's first annual
Administrative Review Board,
on
January 28, 2005.
The memo listed factors for and against his continued detention.

The following primary factors favor continued detention

The following primary factors favor release or transfer

Letter from Mark S. Sullivan
The Department of Defense did not publish the transcript from captive 227's Board hearing.
It did publish a redacted version of a
two-page letter from Mark S. Sullivan, one of the lawyers helping him access the US justice system, dated January 19, 2005, entitled: "Administrative Review Board Submission for Salah Abdul Rasul Al Bloushi, ISN # 227."
They also published an unsigned note.

Sullivan's letter stated, in part:

{| class="wikitable"
|
There is no reliable evidence that Mr. Al Bloushi is, or has ever been, a threat to the United States or its allies. ..

The following factors should be taken into consideration by the ARB with respect to the continued detention of Mr. Al Bloushi:

He was not captured on or near any battlefield.  Instead, he was taken into custody in Pakistan by the Pakistani authorities.

There is no credible evidence that he participated in any hostilities against the US or its allies.

############# ############ ############# ############## ########### ############# ############ ########### ##### ############ ############# ############## ########### ############# ############ ########### ######### ############ ############# ############## ########### ############# ############ ########### ######### This thin reed of speculation and innuendo is hardly sufficient evidence to establish that Mr. Al Bloushi is a member or  al Qaida or any other terrorist organization, or to justify his indefinite incarceration.
|}

The unsigned note said: 

{| class="wikitable"
|
Classification was derived form classified enclosure + exhibits to the Combatant Status Review Tribunal Decision Report, which is attached to a memorandum for Director, CSRT entitled: CSRT Record of Proceedings ICO ISN #227, dated 30 Sep 2004
|}

Second annual Administrative Review Board
The Gulf Daily News reported, on July 2, 2006, that Colangelo-Bryan summarized the allegations against al Blooshi
from his second Administrative Review Board.

 Specifically, the military asserts that Salah went to Afghanistan long before September 11, 2001, when he heard about Buddhist statues being destroyed at Bamyan.
 According to the military, Salah went there to make sure that Afghans were Salafi Muslims.
 The military also says that Salah had 300 Bahraini dinars with him and that he stayed with a friend for two weeks in Kandahar.
 According to the military, this friend suggested that Salah give his passport to a man who is said to be associated in some way with Al Qaeda.
 Finally, the military said that Salah became sick for a month in Jalabad and then travelled to Afghan/Pakistani border.

Colangelo-Bryan asked how, even if the allegations were true, they showed that Al Blooshi had ever represented a threat to the USA.

Summary of Evidence
In September 2007, the DoD released a Summary of Evidence memo prepared for Salah Abdul Rasul Ali Abdul Rahman Al Balushi's second annual Administrative Review Board, on January 30, 2006.
The memo listed factors for and against his continued detention.

The following primary factors favor continued detention

The following primary factors favor release or transfer

Board recommendations
In early September 2007, the Department of Defense released two heavily redacted memos, from his Board, to Gordon R. England, the Designated Civilian Official.
The Board's recommendation was unanimous
The Board's recommendation was redacted.
England authorized his transfer on June 15, 2006.

His Board concluded that he "...continues to be a threat to the United States and its allies."

Al Blooshi's last interrogation
On July 23, 2006, Colangelo-Bryan described Al Blooshi's last interrogation.
He said that the camp authorities acknowledge that 75% of the detainees are no longer interrogated.  He estimated that even fewer detainees are currently being interrogated than US spokesment acknowledged.

Al Blooshi has not been interrogated at all in 2006.  Colangelo-Bryan said that during his last interrogation Al Blooshi was asked about his activities in the war in Bosnia in 1995.

Release
Salah has been released.

On Thursday August 23, 2007, the Gulf Daily News'' reported that
Bahraini Member of Parliament Mohammed Khalid had called for the Bahrain government to provide financial compensation to the released men.

See also
 Abdulla Majid Al Naimi
 Adel Kamel Hajee
 Bahraini captives in Guantanamo
 Essa Al Murbati
 Juma Mohammed Al Dossary
 Shaikh Salman Ebrahim Mohamed Ali Al Khalifa

References

Living people
1981 births
Guantanamo detainees known to have been released
Bahraini people of Baloch descent
Bahraini expatriates in Pakistan
People from Muharraq